The Consulate General of Canada in Hong Kong and Macao represents Canada in the Hong Kong and Macau Special Administrative Regions of the People's Republic of China. As Hong Kong was linked to the Commonwealth during British administration, Canada's mission was called the Canadian Commission before the transfer of sovereignty to China on July 1, 1997. Since 1980, the Head of Mission in Hong Kong has also served as Consul-General to Macau.

Owing to the special status of Hong Kong and Macau, the Consulate General of Canada reports directly to Global Affairs Canada in Ottawa rather than through the Canadian Embassy in Beijing, although it does work closely with its counterparts at the embassy. Under an agreement signed on September 19, 1996, Ottawa and Beijing agreed that the then Commission, to be called the Consulate General, would continue to operate as regulated by normal diplomatic procedures (such as the 1963 Vienna Convention on Consular Relations).

In common with the missions of most other countries in Hong Kong, the Consulate General does not have its own chancery building.  In 1985 it moved located on the 11th to 14th floors in Exchange Square, at 8 Connaught Road Central. These offices provide a base for 23 Canada-based diplomats and 117 locally employed staff delivering a wide variety of services. The office relocated again in 2014 to two locations:

 Office of the Consul-General/Canadian Trade Commissioner Service/Foreign Policy and Diplomacy Service: 5th floor, Tower 3, Exchange Square, 8 Connaught Place
 Consular Section, Immigration Section, Canada Border Services Agency: 9th floor, Berkshire House, 25 Westlands Road, Quarry Bay, Hong Kong
 Administration Section: 8th floor, Berkshire House, 25 Westlands Road, Quarry Bay, Hong Kong

The history of Canadian diplomatic missions in the territory began in 1923 when a Canadian Immigration office was established in Hong Kong. In 1929, Trade Commissioner Paul Sykes opened the Canadian Trade Commission. At the start of World War II (1941), the office was closed, but it reopened in 1946.

The present Consul General is Rachael Bedlington.

The counterpart Hong Kong representation in Canada is the Hong Kong Economic and Trade Office in Toronto.

List of Consuls General and Commissioners 
 Rachael Bedlington 2021-Present
 Jeff Nankivell 2016–2021
 J. Ian Burchett 2011-2016
 Doreen Steidle 2008-2011
 Gerry Campbell 2004-2008
 Anthony Burger 2001-2004
 Colin Russel 1997-2001
 Garrett Lambert 1994-1997
 John P. Higginbotham 1989-1994
 Anne Marie Doyle 1986-1989
 Maurice Copithorne 1983-1986
 R. Allen Kilpatrick 1982-1983
 W.T. Warden 1978-1981
 M.G. Charles 1975-1977
 R.L. Wales 1972-1974
 C.R. Gallow 1966-1971
 R.K. Thomson 1963-1965
 C.M. Forsyth-Smith 1957-1962

See also
 Canada–Hong Kong relations
 Canadians in Hong Kong
 Canadian International School of Hong Kong

References

External links
 Consulate General of Canada in Hong Kong and Macao
 Consulate General of Canada in Hong Kong and Macao Official Facebook Page

Hong Kong
Canada
Canada–China relations
Canada–Hong Kong relations
Central, Hong Kong